Albert the Tall (1236 – 15 August 1279), a member of the House of Welf, was Duke of Brunswick-Lüneburg from 1252 and the first ruler of the newly created Principality of Brunswick-Wolfenbüttel from 1269 until his death.

Life
Albert was the oldest surviving son of the first Brunswick duke Otto the Child and his wife, Matilda of Brandenburg. When his father died in 1252, he took over the rule of the duchy; later his younger brother John joined him. 

Albert's rule was initially troubled by several armed conflicts as the Welf dukes still had to cope with the followers of the extinct Hohenstaufen dynasty within their dominions. In 1260/61 Albert's troops fought against the Danish duke Eric I of Schleswig on behalf of Queen Margaret Sambiria and her minor son King Eric V of Denmark. In 1263 the duke quite luckless interfered in the War of the Thuringian Succession to support the claims raised by his mother-in-law Sophie of Brabant.

On 31 May 1267, the brothers agreed to divide the Welf lands, which happened in 1269. Albert partitioned the territory while John obtained the right to choose his part. He took the northern half including the region of Lüneburg, Celle and the city of Hanover, while Albert received the southern part around the cities of Brunswick and Wolfenbüttel, stretching from the area around the Calenberg hill to the town of Helmstedt, the Harz mountain range, and Göttingen. The Brunswick residence itself was to remain common property of the brothers.

Albert then concentrated on the development of his hereditary lands. During the Imperial interregnum, he sided with the rising Bohemian king Ottokar II until his final defeat in the 1278 Battle on the Marchfeld. When his brother John died in 1277, he took over the guardianship for his minor nephew Otto II of Brunswick-Lüneburg.

Albert died on 15 August 1279 and is buried at Brunswick Cathedral. He was succeeded by his elder three sons, the younger three joined the Church.

Marriage and children
In 1254, Albert married Elizabeth of Brabant (1243 – October 9, 1261), daughter of Duke Henry II of Brabant and Sophie of Thuringia. They had no children.

After Elizabeth's death in 1261, Albert married Adelheid (Alessia) (1242 – February 6, 1284/85), daughter of Margrave Boniface II of Montferrat around 1263. Once widowed she married Gerhard I, Count of Holstein-Itzehoe. Albert and Adelheid had the following children:
 Henry I, Duke of Brunswick-Grubenhagen (1267–1322)
 Albert II, Duke of Brunswick-Lüneburg (1268–1318)
 William I, Duke of Brunswick-Lüneburg (1270–1292)
 Otto (died ca. 1346)
 Luther von Braunschweig (1275- 1335), Grand Master of the Teutonic Knights from 1331.
 Matilda of Brunswick-Lüneburg, (1276-11 Dec 1310) married the Piast duke Henry III of Głogów.
 Conrad (died ca. 1303)

References
 Allgemeine Deutsche Biographie, vol. 1, p. 257-261
 At the House of Welf site
 RootsWeb: Rulers of Brandenburg and their Czech Roots

|-

Princes of Wolfenbüttel
1236 births
1279 deaths
People from the Harz
Christians of the Prussian Crusade
Old House of Brunswick
Burials at Brunswick Cathedral